The Business Education Initiative (BEI) is a British study-abroad programme for students from Northern Ireland. It was run initially by the Department for Employment and Learning but, since 2006, is delivered by the British Council in association with the Department for Employment and Learning in Northern Ireland.

Activities 
Each year approximately 100 students are selected to study business related subjects at participating U.S. colleges and universities. The majority of the student's transport and living expenses are met by the British Council while the US host-institution grants the students a fee-waiver or scholarship.

History 
The programme was established in 1994 and to date approximately 1,350 students have participated. It has proven to be a once in a lifetime experience for the majority of the students who have graduated from the program.

Eligibility 
Applications are accepted from pre-final year undergraduate degree or HND students studying at a Northern Irish higher education college or university.

In the past, the majority of students on the programme have come from the following institutions:
 The Queen's University of Belfast
 St. Mary's University College
 Stranmillis University College
 University of Ulster
 Belfast Metropolitan College
 South Eastern Regional College

Participating U.S. institutions 
A list of participating U.S. colleges and universities for the 2010-2011 academic year is available here (external link).

External links 
 Official Site
 British Council
 Department for Employment & Learning
 History of the Business Education Initiative
 A history of the programme is available

Business education in Northern Ireland
Higher education colleges in Northern Ireland
Organizations established in 1994
United Kingdom educational programs